Romanogobio parvus is a species of cyprinid fish endemic to the Kuban River in Russia

References

Romanogobio
Fish described in 2004